The 2006 ICF Canoe Sprint World Championships were held in Szeged, Hungary, from August 17 to 20 2006. This was the second time the Hungarian city had hosted the championships, doing so previously in 1998.

Men race as individuals, pairs and quads over 200 m, 500 m and 1000 m in both Canoe (Canadian) (C) and Kayak (K) events, giving a total of 18 gold medals. Women compete for only 9 gold medals as they race in kayak events only.

This was the 35th championships in canoe sprint.

Highlights
Host nation Hungary won twelve of the twenty-seven gold medals. Germany, who had topped the medal table in Zagreb in 2005, took four golds, as did Russia.

Hungary's medal haul included victories in all nine women's finals, Natasa Janics and Katalin Kovács winning six titles each.
 
In the men's races, Mexican Everardo Cristóbal shocked the top Europeans with victory in the C-1 1000 m final, giving Mexico their first-ever world championship gold medal. The K-1 1000 m, the Blue Riband event, was won by Markus Oscarsson of Sweden.

Germany's Ronald Rauhe won three gold medals to give him a career total of ten. Hungarian György Kolonics, who holds the (men's) record for paddlers currently in competition, won the fourteenth gold medal of his career in the C-2 1000 m final. Russia's Maksim Opalev won his eleventh title. Other perennial favourites such as Andreas Dittmer, Eirik Verås Larsen and Adam van Koeverden however were unable to repeat previous successes. Germany won their first-ever C-4 title (1000 m). In the men's K-4 races, however, no German boats made the podium – the first time that had happened since 1977. Special mention should also go to the Czech Petr Procházka, the oldest man at the championships, who took gold in the C-4 200 m final.

Medal summary

Men's
 Non-Olympic classes

Canoe

Kayak

Women's
 Non-Olympic classes

Kayak

Medal table

References
Medal table
Results of Flatwater Racing World Championships 
International Canoe Federation
Final A video
Photos

Canoe sprint
Canoe sprint
ICF Canoe Sprint World Championships
International sports competitions hosted by Hungary
Canoeing in Hungary